Gotham, Inc. is an American advertising agency based in New York City.

The Interpublic Group established Gotham in 1994, and it continues to operate as an independent agency of the global marketing services holding company. With this relationship, Gotham has a network of more than 100 partners in over 100 countries.

Accounts

Bausch & Lomb
Best Western
Denny's
Digene
Ensure
FreshDirect
Ganeden
Glucerna
Goody's
Hennessy Black
Hitachi
HomeGoods
Lindt
Lufthansa
Maybelline
Medco
Newman's Own
Pfizer
Sony Ericsson
Waterford
Wedgwood
Yellowbook.com

Sources
Yahoo.com

References

External links
Gotham Website 

Interpublic Group

Advertising agencies based in New York City
Advertising agencies of the United States
Companies based in New York City